Jacob Lorentz Norenberg (born 8 June 1979) is a Norwegian sprint canoer who competed in the mid-2000s. He won a bronze in the K-2 1000 m event at the 2005 ICF Canoe Sprint World Championships in Zagreb.

Norenberg also competed at the 2004 Summer Olympics in Athens, finishing fifth in the K-4 1000 m event.

References

External links
 
 

1979 births
Living people
Sportspeople from Bærum
Norwegian male canoeists
Canoeists at the 2004 Summer Olympics
Olympic canoeists of Norway
ICF Canoe Sprint World Championships medalists in kayak